Hanley Swan is a small village in the English county of Worcestershire. Together with  the nearby  village of Hanley Castle, its population  is about 1500. The traditional English village centre includes a village green and pond, a pub,a Social Club and a village stores. Hanley Swan won the 2009 Calor Herefordshire and Worcestershire Village of the Year competition, a heat of the national Village of the year competition. Hanley Swan was an inspiration for the setting of the novel Black Swan Green by David Mitchell.

History
The Church of Our Lady and St Alphonsus was built, shortly after restrictions against Catholic churches were lifted in 1829, by descendents of Thomas Hornyold who had aided Charles II's escape. As elsewhere in Worcestershire, the continuing Catholic connections of the county meant that new Catholic churches were established with greater funding than in many other parts of the country.

References

External links

 Benefice of Hanley Castle with Hanley Swan and Welland Official web page of the Diocese of Worcester.
 The Hanley Swan & Hanley Castle web site

Sources
 

Villages in Worcestershire